Kefir (also spelled as kephir or kefier; ;) is a fermented milk drink similar to a thin yogurt or ayran that is made from kefir grains, a specific type of mesophilic symbiotic culture. The drink originated in the North Caucasus, in particular the Elbrus region along the upper mountainous sections of Circassia, Karachay and Balkaria, from where it came to Russia, and from there it spread to Europe, Canada, and the United States, where it is prepared by inoculating the milk of cows, goats, or sheep with kefir grains.

Kefir is a breakfast, lunch, and dinner drink popular across Russia, Belarus, Estonia, Hungary, Latvia, Lithuania, Poland, Romania, Ukraine, and Czech Republic – where it is known as an affordable health drink. It is also known in Norway, Sweden, and Finland, where buttermilk-type fermented dairy drinks are common. Kefir is common particularly among Russian and Estonian minorities.  In South Slavic countries, kefir is consumed at any time of the day, especially with zelnik/zeljanica, burek and banitsa/gibanica, as well as in cold soups served in the summer.

Origin and etymology 
The word kefir, known in Russian language and Eastern-European countries since at least 1884, is of North Caucasian origin. A Russian borrowing in English, its ultimate origin is unknown. The folk-etymological hypothesis of its ultimate origins in Old Turkic köpür (froth) are unsubstantiated by authoritative sources. More likely is another Caucasian origin; compare Mingrelian ქიფური (kipuri), Ossetian къӕпы (k’æpy), Karachay-Balkar гыпы (gıpı). The p to f transformation may indicate possible transmission to Russian through Arabic كِفِير‎ (kifīr), which would have served as a lingua franca in the Muslim parts of the Caucasus.

Traditional kefir was made in goatskin bags that were hung near a doorway; the bags would be knocked by anyone passing through to keep the milk and kefir grains well mixed. In Karachay-Balkar gıpı, which has connection with gıbıt (wineskin). It was under the name "wineskin" that Karachay kefir was distributed in the second half of the 19th century and at the beginning of the 20th century. Kefir spread from the former Soviet Union to the rest of Europe, Canada, Japan, and the United States by the early 21st century. It has become known in parts of Latin America as búlgaros, or "Bulgarians".

The homeland of kefir is considered to be "the vicinity of Elbrus along the upper reaches of the Kuban".

Fermentation 

Traditional kefir is fermented at ambient temperatures, generally overnight. Fermentation of the lactose yields a sour, carbonated, slightly alcoholic beverage, with a consistency and taste similar to drinkable yogurt.

The kefir grains initiating the fermentation are initially created by auto-aggregations of Lactobacillus kefiranofaciens and Kazachstania turicensis, where multiple biofilm producers cause the surfaces to adhere which form a three dimensional microcolony. The biofilm is a matrix of heteropolysaccharides called kefiran, which is composed of equal proportions of glucose and galactose. It resembles small cauliflower grains, with color ranging from white to creamy yellow. A complex and highly variable symbiotic community can be found in these grains, which can include acetic acid bacteria (such as A. aceti and A. rasens), yeasts (such as Candida kefyr and S. cerevisiae) and a number of Lactobacillus species, such as L. parakefiri, L. kefiranofaciens (and subsp. kefirgranum), L. kefiri, etc. While some microbes predominate, Lactobacillus species are always present. The microbe flora can vary between batches of kefir due to factors such as the kefir grains rising out of the milk while fermenting or curds forming around the grains, as well as temperature. Additionally, Tibetan kefir composition differs from that of the Russian kefir, Irish kefir, Taiwan kefir and Turkey fermented beverage with kefir. In recent years, the use of freeze-dried starter culture has become common due to stability of the fermentation result, because the species of microbes are selected in laboratory conditions, as well as easy transportation.

During fermentation, changes in the composition of ingredients occur. Lactose, the sugar present in milk, is broken down mostly to lactic acid (25%) by the lactic acid bacteria, which results in acidification. Propionibacteria further break down some of the lactic acid into propionic acid (these bacteria also carry out the same fermentation in Swiss cheese). Other substances that contribute to the flavor of kefir are pyruvic acid, acetic acid, diacetyl and acetoin (both of which contribute a "buttery" flavor), citric acid, acetaldehyde, and amino acids resulting from protein breakdown.

Decreased lactose content
During the fermentation process, bacteria and yeast break lactose down into glucose and galactose. As a result of the fermentation, lactose levels are decreased by 20–30% with respect to the initial lactose levels present in the milk. One study found that when people with lactose intolerance consumed the same amount of lactose in milk, kefir or yoghurt products, the latter two showed significantly reduced symptoms of lactose intolerance during the first 8 hours after consumption. This result suggests that yoghurt and kefir might be suitable for people with lactose intolerance. However, the long-term impact of kefir consumption on lactose intolerance has not been studied. It has also been shown that fermented milk products have a slower transit time than milk, which may further improve lactose digestion.

Alcohol content
Kefir contains ethanol, which is detectable in the blood of human consumers. The level of ethanol in kefir can vary by production method. A 2016 study of kefir sold in Germany showed an ethanol level of only 0.02 g per litre, which was attributed to fermentation under controlled conditions allowing the growth of Lactobacteria only, but excluding the growth of other microorganisms that form much higher amounts of ethanol. A 2008 study of German commercial kefir found levels of 0.002-0.005% of ethanol. Kefir produced by small-scale dairies in Russia early in the 20th century had 1-2% ethanol. Modern processes, which use shorter fermentation times, result in much lower ethanol concentrations of 0.2–0.3%.

Nutrition

Composition 
Kefir products contain nutrients in varying amounts from negligible to significant, including dietary minerals, vitamins, essential amino acids, and conjugated linoleic acid, in amounts similar to unfermented cow, goat, or sheep milk. At a pH of 4.2 – 4.6, kefir is composed mainly of water and by-products of the fermentation process, including carbon dioxide and ethanol.

Typical of milk, several dietary minerals are found in kefir, such as calcium, iron, phosphorus, magnesium, potassium, sodium, copper, molybdenum, manganese, and zinc in amounts that have not been standardized to a reputable nutrient database. Also similar to milk, kefir contains vitamins in variable amounts, including vitamin A, vitamin B1 (thiamine), vitamin B2 (riboflavin), vitamin B3 (niacin), vitamin B6 (pyridoxine), vitamin B9 (folic acid), vitamin B12 (cyanocobalamin), vitamin C, vitamin D, and vitamin E. Essential amino acids found in kefir include methionine, cysteine, tryptophan, phenylalanine, tyrosine, leucine, isoleucine, threonine, lysine, and valine, as for any milk product.

Microbiota 
Probiotic bacteria found in kefir products include: Lactobacillus acidophilus, Bifidobacterium bifidum, Streptococcus thermophilus, Lactobacillus delbrueckii subsp. bulgaricus, Lactobacillus helveticus, Lactobacillus kefiranofaciens, Lactococcus lactis, and Leuconostoc species. Lactobacilli in kefir may exist in concentrations varying from approximately 1 million to 1 billion colony-forming units per milliliter, and are the bacteria responsible for the synthesis of the polysaccharide kefiran.

In addition to bacteria, kefir often contains strains of yeast that can metabolize lactose, such as Kluyveromyces marxianus, Kluyveromyces lactis, and Saccharomyces fragilis, as well as strains of yeast that do not metabolize lactose, including Saccharomyces cerevisiae, Torulaspora delbrueckii, and Kazachstania unispora. The nutritional significance of these strains is unknown.

Production 

Modern kefir is made by adding kefir grains to milk typically at a proportion of 2–5% grains-to-milk. The mixture is then placed in a corrosion-resistant container, such as a glass jar, and stored preferably in the dark to prevent degradation of light-sensitive vitamins. After a period between 12 and 24 hours of fermentation at mild temperature, ideally 20–25 °C (68–77 °F), the grains are strained from the milk using a corrosion-resistant (stainless steel or plastic) utensil and kept to produce another batch. During the fermentation process the grains enlarge and eventually split forming new units.

The resulting fermented liquid may be drunk, used in recipes, or kept aside in a sealed container for additional time to undergo a secondary fermentation. Because of its acidity the beverage should not be stored in reactive metal containers such as aluminium, copper, or zinc, as these may leach into it over time. The shelf life, unrefrigerated, is up to thirty days.

The Russian method permits production of kefir on a larger scale and uses two fermentations. The first step is to prepare the cultures by inoculating milk with 2–3% grains as described. The grains are then removed by filtration and 1–3% of the resulting liquid mother culture is added to milk and fermented for 12 to 18 hours.

Kefir can be made using freeze-dried cultures commonly available in powder form from health food stores. A portion of the resulting kefir can be saved to be used a number of times to propagate further fermentations but ultimately does not form grains.

In Taiwan, researchers were able to produce kefir in laboratory using microorganisms isolated from kefir grains. They report that the resulting kefir drink had chemical properties similar to homemade kefir.

Milk types 
Kefir grains will ferment the milk from most mammals and will continue to grow in such milk. Typical animal milks used include cow, goat, and sheep, each with varying organoleptic (flavor, aroma, and texture) and nutritional qualities. Raw milk has been traditionally used.

Milk sugar is not essential for the synthesis of the polysaccharide that makes up the grains (kefiran), and rice hydrolysate is a suitable alternative medium. Additionally, kefir grains will reproduce when fermenting soy milk, although they will change in appearance and size due to the differing proteins available to them.

A variation of kefir grains that thrive in sugary water also exists, see water kefir (or tibicos), and can vary markedly from milk kefir in both appearance and microbial composition.

Culinary 

As it contains Lactobacillus bacteria, kefir can be used to make a sourdough bread. It is also useful as a buttermilk substitute in baking. Kefir is one of the main ingredients in cold borscht soup in Lithuania, also known in Poland as Lithuanian cold soup (chłodnik litewski), and other countries. Kefir-based soup okroshka is common across the former Soviet Union. Kefir may be used in place of milk on cereal, granola, milkshakes, salad dressing, ice cream, smoothies and soup.

See also 

 List of yogurt-based dishes and beverages

Other fermented dairy products 

 Airag
 Amasi
 Ayran
 Buttermilk
 Chaas
 Chalap
 Cheese
 Cream cheese
 Doogh
 Filmjölk
 Kefir cheese
 Kumis
 Leben
 Labneh
 Lassi
 Matzoon
 Mursik
 Ryazhenka
 
 Shubat
 Skyr
 Varenets
 Viili
 Yogurt

Other fermented beverages 

 Boza
 Tibicos ("Water Kefir")
 Kombucha

References

External links

Fermented Foods: Kefir, from the National Center for Home Food Preservation

Fermented dairy products
Fermented drinks
Milk-based drinks
Russian drinks
Russian desserts
Sour foods
Turkish drinks
Ukrainian drinks
Polish drinks